Pleioceras orientale is a species of plant in the family Apocynaceae. It is native to Kenya, Tanzania, and Mozambique.

The species is listed as vulnerable.

References

orientale
Vulnerable plants
Flora of Africa
Plants described in 1980
Taxonomy articles created by Polbot